Raad-2 (Persian:رعد-۲, means Thunder-2) is an Iranian self-propelled howitzer.

Development
In early September 1997, it was reported that Iran had successfully tested a locally built rapid fire mobile field gun known as Raad-2 (Thunder-2).

It uses a turret that has a similar layout to the M109A1 155mm/39-cal self-propelled howitzer. The Iranian Defense Industries Organization claimed that the 155 mm HM44 howitzer manufactured by the Hadid facility of the Iranian Defense Industries Organization had a high firing rate and accuracy.

The gun looks exactly like 155mm/39-cal M185 gun from M109A1 and is fitted with a double baffle muzzle brake, fume extractor, screw breech mechanism, hydro-pneumatic recuperator and a hydraulic recoil brake. DIO says that the barrel life is around 5,000 rounds.

The vehicle uses a chassis based on the T-72, distinctive due to the cover of the cooling fan on the chassis. The hull is apparently based on the BMP-1.

The Raad-2 is crewed by 5 persons, with the driver stationed at the left with the power pack at the right.

Variants
Raad-2 - basic SPG version with a Russian V12-type V-84MS diesel engine
Raad-2M - Raad-2 upgraded with a Ukrainian-made 5TDF engine instead of a V-8 Diesel engine.

References

Armoured fighting vehicles of Iran
Self-propelled artillery of Iran
Post–Cold War weapons of Iran
Military vehicles introduced in the 1990s